Saint Dmitry Ivanovich Donskoy (also known as Dimitrii or Demetrius), or Dmitry of the Don, sometimes referred to simply as Dmitry (12 October 1350 – 19 May 1389), son of Ivan II the Fair of Moscow (1326–1359), reigned as the Prince of Moscow from 1359 and Grand Prince of Vladimir from 1363 to his death. He was the first prince of Moscow to openly challenge Mongol authority in Russia. He is regarded as a Russian national hero and central figure of the Middle Ages. His nickname, Donskoy ("of the Don"), alludes to his great victory against the Tatars in the Battle of Kulikovo (1380), which took place on the Don River. He is venerated as a Saint in the Orthodox Church with his feast day on 19 May.

Early reign

Dmitry was born in Moscow in 1350, the son of Ivan the Fair, Grand Prince of Moscow, and his second wife, Alexandra Vassilievna Velyaminova, the daughter of the mayor of Moscow. Dmitry was orphaned at the age of nine and ascended the throne of the Principality of Moscow. Per the terms of Ivan's will, during Dmitry's minority, Metropolitan Aleksey served as regent.

In 1360 Khiḍr Khan, Khan of the Golden Horde, transferred the title most prized among the Rus' princes, that of Grand Prince of Vladimir, to Dmitry Konstantinovich of Nizhny Novgorod. In 1363, after that prince was deposed, Dmitry Ivanovich was crowned at Vladimir. Three years later, he made peace with Dmitry Konstantinovich and married his daughter Eudoxia.

The most important event during Dmitry's early reign was to start building the Moscow Kremlin; it was completed in 1367. Thanks to the new fortress, the city withstood two sieges by Algirdas of Lithuania during the Lithuanian–Muscovite War (1368–1372). The war ended with the Treaty of Lyubutsk. In 1375, Dmitry settled, in his own favor, a conflict with Mikhail II of Tver over Vladimir. Other princes of Northern Russia acknowledged his authority and contributed troops to the impending struggle against the Horde. By the end of his reign, Dmitry had more than doubled the territory of the Principality of Moscow.

Struggle against Mamai

Mongol domination of Rus' began to crumble during Dmitry's thirty-year reign. The Golden Horde was severely weakened by civil war and dynastic rivalries. Dmitry took advantage of this lapse in Mongol authority to openly challenge the Tatars. While he kept the Khan's patent to collect taxes for all of Rus', Dmitry is also famous for leading the first Rus' military victory over the Mongols. Mamai, a Mongol general and claimant to the throne, tried to punish Dmitry for attempting to increase his power. In 1378 Mamai sent a Mongol army, but it was defeated by Dmitry's forces in the Battle of Vozha River.

Two years later Mamai personally led a large force against Moscow. Sergius of Radonezh blessed Dmitry Donskoy when he went to fight the Tatars in the signal Battle of Kulikovo field, but only after he was certain Dmitry had pursued all peaceful means of resolving the conflict. Sergius sent the two warrior monks Alexander Peresvet and his friend Rodion Oslyabya to join the Rus' troops. The battle of Kulikovo was opened by single combat between two champions. The Rus' champion was Alexander Peresvet. The Horde champion was Temir-murza. The champions killed each other in the first run. Dmitry defeated the Horde. In gratitude for the victory, Dmitry established the Dormition monastery on the Dubenka River and built a church in honor of the Nativity of the Holy Theotokos over the graves of the fallen warriors.

The defeated Mamai was presently dethroned by a rival Mongol general, Tokhtamysh.  That khan reasserted Mongol rule of Rus and overran Moscow in 1382 for Dmitry's resistance to Mamai. Dmitry, however, pledged his loyalty to Tokhtamysh and to the Golden Horde and was reinstated as Mongol principal tax collector and Grand Duke of Vladimir. Upon his death in Moscow in 1389, Dmitry was the first Grand Duke to bequeath his titles to his son Vasili I of Moscow without consulting the Khan.

Marriage and children

He was married to Eudoxia of Nizhniy Novgorod. She was a daughter of Dmitry of Suzdal and Vasilisa of Rostov. They had at least twelve children:

Daniil Dmitriyevich (c. 1370 – 15 September 1379).
Vasiliy I of Moscow (30 September 1371 – 27 February 1425).
Sofia Dmitriyevna. Married Fyodor Olegovich, Prince of Ryazan (reigned 1402–1427).
Yuriy Dmitriyevich, Duke of Zvenigorod and Galich (26 November 1374 – 5 June 1434). Claimed the throne of Moscow against his nephew Vasiliy II of Moscow.
Maria Dmitriyevna (d. 15 May 1399). Married Lengvenis.
Anastasia Dmitriyevna. Married Ivan Vsevolodovich, Prince of Kholm.
Simeon Dmitrievich (d. 11 September 1379).
Ivan Dmitriyevich (d. 1393).
Andrey Dmitriyevich, Prince of Mozhaysk (14 August 1382 – 9 July 1432).
Pyotr Dmitriyevich, Prince of Dmitrov (29 July 1385 – 10 August 1428).
Anna Dmitriyevna (born 8 January 1387). Married Yury Patrikiyevich. Her husband was a son of Patrikas, Prince of Starodub and his wife Helena. His paternal grandfather was Narimantas. The marriage solidified his role as a Boyar attached to Moscow.
Konstantin Dmitriyevich, Prince of Pskov (14 May/15 May 1389 – 1433).

Veneration 

Right-Believing Prince Demetrius Ioannovich Donskoy was canonized on 6 June 1988 in Trinity Lavra of St. Sergius by 1988 Local Council of the Russian Orthodox Church under Patriarch Pimen I of Moscow.

Gallery

See also
 Bibliography of Russian history (1223–1613)
Rulers of Russia family tree
Dmitry Donskoy, opera by Anton Rubinstein (1852).
Dmitri Donskoi (ship)

References

External links

 
 

 
 

 
 

1350 births
1389 deaths
14th-century Grand Princes of Moscow
14th-century Christian saints
14th-century Russian princes
Russian saints of the Eastern Orthodox Church
Grand Princes of Moscow
Grand Princes of Vladimir
Medieval child monarchs
Eastern Orthodox royal saints
Rurik dynasty
Yurievichi family
Russian saints